The Clifton Merriman Post Office Building, also known as the U.S. Post Office-Central Square is an historic post office at 770 Massachusetts Avenue within Central Square in Cambridge, Massachusetts.

The post office was built in 1933 and added to the National Register of Historic Places in 1986 as "U.S. Post Office-Central Square". In 1992, the United States Congress passed a bill renaming it for Clifton Merriman, an African-American World War I veteran who later became assistant superintendent of the main Post Office in Cambridge.

See also 
National Register of Historic Places listings in Cambridge, Massachusetts
List of United States post offices

References

External links

Merriman
Buildings and structures in Cambridge, Massachusetts
National Register of Historic Places in Cambridge, Massachusetts
Historic district contributing properties in Massachusetts
Government buildings completed in 1933